Aaron Robert Keyes (born September 8, 1978) is an American Christian musician. He released Not Guilty Anymore through Kingsway Records in 2007. His subsequent album, Dwell, was released by Kingsway Records in 2011. This album was his breakthrough release on the Billboard magazine Christian Albums chart.

Early life
Keyes was born on September 8, 1978, as Aaron Robert Keyes, in Greenville, South Carolina, at Bob Jones Hospital. His father is a preacher.

Music career
He started his music career in 1998 and released his first album, Because, in March 2004. His subsequent album, Not Guilty Anymore, was released on August 24, 2010 by Kingsway Records. This album was reviewed by Christianity Today, Cross Rhythms, Jesus Freak Hideout, and Louder Than the Music. He released Dwell with Kingsway Communications on June 21, 2011. The album was his breakthrough release on the Billboard magazine charts, where it peaked at No. 43 on the Christian Albums chart. This album was reviewed by AllMusic, Christianity Today, Cross Rhythms, Jesus Freak Hideout, and Louder Than the Music.

Discography
Studio albums

References

External links
 Official website
 Cross Rhythms artist profile
 Louder Than the Music artist profile

1978 births
Living people
American performers of Christian music
Musicians from Georgia (U.S. state)
Musicians from South Carolina
Songwriters from Georgia (U.S. state)
Songwriters from South Carolina
Performers of contemporary worship music